Dolichoderus parvus is a species of ant in the genus Dolichoderus. Described by John S. Clark in 1930, the species is endemic to Australia, found in dry sclerophyll habitats.

References

Dolichoderus
Hymenoptera of Australia
Insects described in 1930